The 1996 Sicilian regional election was held on 16 June 1996.

The Sicilian Regional Assembly ended up very fragmented after the election and it was difficult to form a stable governing coalition. Between 1996 and 2001 the Region was thus governed by a succession of short-lived governments.

Results

Elections in Sicily
1996 elections in Italy
June 1996 events in Europe